Eldar Mikayilzade — Azerbaijani carpet artist; Member of the Union of Artists of Azerbaijan (2018), USSR Union of Artists (1986), Russian Artists Union (2004) and UNESCO; Author of the first sketches of the Azerbaijani Manat.

Early life and activities 
Eldar Mikayilzade was born in 1956 in Amirdjaan village of Baku.

In 1971-1975, after graduating from the Fine Arts faculty of Baku Art School named after Azim Azimzade, he graduated from the Azerbaijan State Institute of Arts in Decorative Applied Art, specialty carpeting. He continued his education at the then Leningrad Academy of Arts. He devoted his first works of art in 1977 to his native village and named it the New Hila as a sign of love. Since 1984 he started his career as a carpet-artist.

Initially he works at the Azerbaijan Academy of Sciences, carpet weaving department, then works as a chief painter at the Azherkhalcha Scientific Creative Production Union. Together with her, she continues her labor activity as Deputy General Director and Chief Executive Officer. Later, he created his own "Khali" company. Since 1993 he has been Deputy Chairman of the Cultural Affairs Department of the Caucasian Muslims. He is also the member of the Union of Artists of the USSR since 1986, the member of Union of Artists of the Russian Artists Union and UNESCO since 2004.

His works are kept in private collections in Russia, Great Britain, France, Turkey, Saudi Arabia and Kuwait.

His works

Carpets 
"Yeni Xilə" - 1977.
"Səttar dünyası" - 1979.
"Şəbi-hicran-1" - 1981.
"İthaf" - (These rwo carpets dedicated to Sattar Bahlulzade and Latif Kərimov);
"Azərbaycan nağılları".
"114. Bismillah".
"Nağıllar aləmi" - 1983.
"Azərbaycanın poeziya və musiqi korifeyləri" - 1983-1984.
"Xətai" - 1990.
"Xəmsə" - 1991.
"İslam" - 1992.
"Təbriz - 1993.
"Bürclər - 1994.
"Xilaskar" - 1995-1997.
"Üç din" - 1998.
"Səttar" - 1999.
"Bismillahir-rəhmanir-rəhim" - 2001.
"Üç peyğəmbər" - 2003.
"Şəbi-hicran-2" - 2006.
"Yaranış"[3] - 2010.
"Səttarın arzusu" - 2012.
"Kəhkəşan" - 2012.

Banknotes 
 1 manat
 5 manat
 10 manat
 50 manat
 100 manat
 250 manat
 500 manat
 1000 manat

References 

Living people
1956 births
Azerbaijani artists
21st-century Azerbaijani painters